Lincoln Square may refer to:
Lincoln Square (Bellevue), Washington
Lincoln Square (Carlton, Victoria), Australia
Lincoln Square, Chicago
Lincoln Square, Manchester
Lincoln Square, Manhattan
Lincoln Square Productions
Lincoln Square Synagogue
Lincoln Square, Philadelphia
Lincoln Square Mall Urbana, Illinois